The 2001 Washington State Cougars football team represented Washington State University as a member of the Pacific-10 Conference during the 2001 NCAA Division I-A football season. The team was led by 12th-year head coach Mike Price and played its home games on campus at Martin Stadium in Pullman, Washington.

Opening with seven straight wins, Washington State was 9–2 in the regular season and 6–2 in the conference play, placing in a three-way tie for second in the Pac-10. Invited to the Sun Bowl on New Year's Eve, the Cougars defeated Purdue for their tenth win, and were tenth in the final rankings.

Four defensive backs on the team, Lamont Thompson, Jason David, Marcus Trufant, and Erik Coleman, went on to play in the National Football League (NFL).

Schedule

Game summaries

Idaho

References

Washington State
Washington State Cougars football seasons
Sun Bowl champion seasons
Washington State Cougars football